Decoding COVID-19 is a 2020 American PBS documentary television film from the American TV series, NOVA, that was released on May 13, 2020. The documentary film examines the COVID-19 pandemic over its initial six months, from its beginning in the last months of 2019 in Wuhan, Hubei, China to May 2020.

Overview
SARS-CoV-2 is a coronavirus that causes COVID-19 disease, and has been responsible for a pandemic throughout the world. The film describes the history of the COVID-19 disease over its initial six months, from its beginning in the last months of 2019 in Wuhan, Hubei, China to May 2020. The film also presents the search for a safe and effective treatment. In addition, details of the effect of the disease on the human body at a microscopic level are described. According to film producer Julia Cort, "This film goes beyond the disease itself, telling a deeply human story of cooperation and innovation as scientists and researchers race to save lives in the face of a common enemy." According to producer Chris Schmidt, "This film examines an encouraging array of innovative new approaches that scientists are now pursuing to harness the immune system to fight back. And, we show how advances in genomics, combined with a new level of openness in sharing data and results among experts and health officials around the world, have greatly accelerated efforts."

Participants

The documentary film includes the following participants (alphabetized by last name):

 Galit Alter, Ragon Institute of Massachusetts General Hospital, MIT, Harvard
 Dan Barouch, Ragon Institute of Massachusetts General Hospital, MIT, Harvard
 Nahid Bhadelia, Boston University School of Medicine
 Kizzmekia Corbett, National Institutes of Health (NIH)
 Ronald B. Corley, Boston University National Emerging Infectious Diseases Laboratories (NEIDL)
 Rhiju Das, Stanford University
 Robert A. Davey, Boston University's National Emerging Infectious Diseases Laboratories (NEIDL)
 Michael Osterholm, University of Minnesota Center for Infectious Disease Research and Policy
 David Pride, University of California, San Diego
 Liu Qi, 21-year-old university student who is among the first to contract the disease
 Craig Sechler, narrator
 Jeffrey Shaman, Columbia University
 Duane Wesemann, Harvard Medical School, and others

See also

 COVID-19 pandemic by country and territory
 
 
 List of epidemics and pandemics
 List of NOVA episodes

References

External links
  at the PBS WebSite
 
 Joint ACAIM-WACEM COVID-19 Working Group Consensus Paper (April 2020)

2020 American television episodes
2020 television films
2020 films
2020 documentary films
American documentary television films
Documentary films about the COVID-19 pandemic
Nova (American TV program) episodes
Television shows about the COVID-19 pandemic
2020s American films